Monique is a 1970 drama film directed and written by John Bown.

It may be the first British film to tackle the then-taboo subject of 'troilism'.

Plot summary
Monique (Sibylla Kay) is a French au pair who goes to work for Jean (Joan Alcorn) and her husband Bill (David Sumner). She takes time to care for the children before getting to know husband and wife intimately. Bill soon notices his wife has become more sexually aroused. After Bill sleeps with Monique, he comes home one day to discover the two women in bed together.

Cast
 David Sumner - Bill
 Joan Alcorn - Jean
 Sibylla Kay - Monique
 Nicola Bown - Susan
 Jacob Fitz-Jones - Edward
 Davilia O'Connor - Harriet
 Carol Hawkins (as Carolanne Hawkins) - Blonde Girl 
 Howard Rawlinson - Richard

References

External links

1970 films
1970 drama films
1970 LGBT-related films
British drama films
LGBT-related drama films
1970s English-language films
1970s British films